Andrew Emlyn "Drew" McMaster (born 10 May 1957 in Edinburgh) is a retired Scottish sprinter.

In 1976, he was Scottish, AAA's Indoor, and Junior 200 metres champion. He went on to win two further Scottish 200 metres titles in 1977, and 78.

In 1978, he went with the Scottish athletics team to the Edmonton Commonwealth Games where he won the 4x100 relay Gold Medal alongside David Jenkins, Allan Wells, and Cameron Sharp.

He also won the Scottish 100 metres championships in 1981 and 1982.

He was runner up in the UK Championships in the 100/200 in 1978 and 1980.

In 1980, he competed at the Summer Olympics in Moscow, where he competed for Great Britain in the 100 metres where he did not get past the quarter final, but he anchored the British team in the sprint relay that finished 4th in the final with a then British record of 38.62 seconds.

In 1981, he took third place in the AAA's 100 metres.

In 1982, he went to the Brisbane Commonwealth Games where he won a bronze medal with the sprint relay team, and also made it to the 100 metres final where he finished eighth.

His personal bests were 10.37 seconds for the 100 metres and 20.77 sec for the 200 metres.

In 1995, he admitted that he had taken performance-enhancing drugs. In 2016, McMaster revealed that he knew for certain that at least six other athletes did the same during the 1980s.

References

Sport-Reference.com
Olympic Games 1980, Men: 4 x 100 m Relay

gbrathletics
BBC Sport

1957 births
Living people
Scottish male sprinters
Sportspeople from Edinburgh
Athletes (track and field) at the 1980 Summer Olympics
Olympic athletes of Great Britain
Athletes (track and field) at the 1978 Commonwealth Games
Athletes (track and field) at the 1982 Commonwealth Games
Commonwealth Games gold medallists for Scotland
Commonwealth Games bronze medallists for Scotland
Commonwealth Games medallists in athletics
Medallists at the 1978 Commonwealth Games
Medallists at the 1982 Commonwealth Games